is a passenger railway station located in Nishi-ku, Yokohama, Japan, operated by the private railway operator Sagami Railway (Sotetsu).

Lines 
Hiranumabashi Station is served by the Sagami Railway Main Line, and lies 0.9 kilometers from the starting point of the line at Yokohama Station.

Station layout
The station consists of a single island platform serving two tracks.
The tracks of the Yokosuka Line and Tōkaidō Main Line run immediately adjacent Hiranumabashi Station.

Platforms

History 
The station was the terminal of the line for two years between 1931 and 1933. The Jinchū Railway originating at Atsugi Station reached Nishi-Yokohama Station and was connected with the Tōkaidō Main Line (via the freight branch to Hodogaya Station) in 1929. The railway then extended the line toward Yokohama Station in two phases: first to Hiranumabashi Station on 25 October 1931 and then to the permanent terminal in Yokohama on 27 December 1933.

The track between Nishi-Yokohama and Hiranumabashi was originally a siding of the Tōkaidō Main Line and was leased to the Jinchū Railway.

Passenger statistics
In fiscal 2019, the station was used by an average of 8,926 passengers daily.

The passenger figures for previous years are as shown below.

Surrounding area
 Yokohama City West Public Hall / West District Center
 Yokohama City Hiranuma Elementary School
 Yokohama City Okano Junior High School
 Kanagawa Prefectural Yokohama Hiranuma High School

See also
 List of railway stations in Japan

References

External links 

 Official home page 

Railway stations in Kanagawa Prefecture
Railway stations in Japan opened in 1931
Railway stations in Yokohama